The Belleville Jail, (or Gaol), located in Belleville, Ontario, Canada, was a maximum-security facility housing offenders awaiting trial, sentencing, transfer to federal and provincial correctional facilities, immigration hearings or deportation, and less frequently, those serving short sentences (under 90 days). The jail opened in 1838 as the Hastings County Jail (it was renamed when the province took control of county jails) and closed in 1971, being replaced by the Quinte Detention Centre in the town of Napanee.

See also 
 List of correctional facilities in Ontario

References

Belleville, Ontario
Defunct prisons in Ontario
1838 establishments in Canada
1971 disestablishments in Ontario